Jason Stanley (born 1969) is an American philosopher who is the Jacob Urowsky Professor of Philosophy at Yale University. He is best known for his contributions to philosophy of language and epistemology, which often draw upon and influence other fields, including linguistics and cognitive science. He has written for a popular audience on the New York Times philosophy blog "The Stone". In his more recent work, Stanley has brought tools from philosophy of language and epistemology to bear on questions of political philosophy, especially in his 2015 book How Propaganda Works.

Early life and education 

Stanley was raised in upstate New York in a Jewish family. He graduated from Corcoran High School in Syracuse, New York. During high school, he studied in Lünen, Germany, for one year as part of the Congress-Bundestag Youth Exchange. He enrolled in the State University of New York in Binghamton, New York, where he studied philosophy of language under Jack Kaminsky. In 1987 he transferred to University of Tübingen, but returned to the State University of New York in 1988, this time at the Stony Brook campus. There, he studied philosophy and linguistics under Peter Ludlow and Richard Larson. Stanley received his BA in May 1990. He went on to earn his PhD from the Massachusetts Institute of Technology in January 1995, with Robert Stalnaker as his thesis advisor.

Career 

After receiving his doctorate, Stanley accepted a position at University College, Oxford, as a stipendiary lecturer. He returned to New York and taught at Cornell University until 2000. He was appointed an Associate Professor of Philosophy at the University of Michigan, Ann Arbor. In 2004, he moved to the department of philosophy at Rutgers University, where he taught from 2004 to 2013. In March 2013 he accepted a professorship at Yale University.

Stanley is the author of five books, including How Propaganda Works (2015) and How Fascism Works (2018). As a philosopher of language and an authority on propaganda and fascism, Stanley's work often views contemporary politics and foreign affairs through the lens of Nazi Germany and the Holocaust. He has been interviewed by Vox in 2018 and 2021; NPR in 2020; KCRW in Los Angeles in 2020; and WBUR in Boston in 2021.

Personal life
Both of Stanley's parents emigrated to the United States from Europe – his father from Germany in 1939, and his mother from Poland. He grew up in upstate New York. He is the grandson of Ilse Stanley, who secured the release of 412 people from Nazi concentration camps from 1936 to 1938. Stanley describes his Jewish background as informing his writing on fascism: "To me, my Judaism means an obligation to pay attention to equality and the rights of minority groups."

Awards 

His book Knowledge and Practical Interests won the 2007 American Philosophical Association book prize.

In 2016, Stanley earned a PROSE Award in philosophy for his book How Propaganda Works.

Publications

References

External links 

 Staff Homepage at Yale University

1969 births
20th-century American essayists
20th-century American male writers
20th-century American philosophers
21st-century American essayists
21st-century American male writers
21st-century American philosophers
American anti-fascists
American male bloggers
American bloggers
American male essayists
American male non-fiction writers
American people of German descent
American people of Polish-Jewish descent
American philosophy academics
American political philosophers
American social commentators
Analytic philosophers
American cognitive scientists
Cornell University faculty
Epistemologists
Historians of fascism
Jewish anti-fascists
Jewish philosophers
Living people
Massachusetts Institute of Technology alumni
People from Syracuse, New York
Philosophers of culture
Philosophers of education
Philosophers of history
Philosophers of language
Philosophers of social science
Philosophy writers
Rutgers University faculty
Social philosophers
Trope theorists
University of Michigan faculty
Writers about activism and social change
Yale University faculty